Gerhard Carsten Jakob von Hosstrup (or Hoßtrup) (born 23 April 1771 in Hamburg, died 7 September 1851) was a Hamburg businessman and the founder of the Hamburg Stock Exchange building (Hamburger Börsenhalle). He became Oberalter in 1843.

He was married to Sophie Henriette Elisabeth (Betty) Seyler (1789–1837), and after her death in 1837 to her sister Louise Auguste Seyler. They were members of the Berenberg-Gossler-Seyler banking dynasty, being the daughters of Ludwig Erdwin Seyler and granddaughters of Johann Hinrich Gossler and Elisabeth Berenberg. They were also granddaughters of theatre director Abel Seyler. Gerhard von Hosstrup was the father of Egmont von Hosstrup and Gerhard Ludwig von Hosstrup, and of Bertha von Hosstrup, married to Albert Hänel.

He was the brother-in-law of Hamburg ship broker Ernst Friedrich Pinckernelle and Norwegian industrialist Jacob Benjamin Wegner.

Literature 
Meyers Konversations-Lexikon, 4. Auflage von 1888–1890
Die Hamburger Börsen-Halle des Gerhard Carsten Jacob von Hoßtrup, Hamburg, [Schauenburger Str. 55] : C. E. Leverkus, 2002

German investors
1771 births
1851 deaths
German bankers